Scott Russell Tancock (born 29 December 1993) is a Welsh footballer who plays as a central defender for Haverfordwest County, having previously played for Swansea City.

Club career
Born in Swansea, Wales, Tancock is a product of the Swansea City academy, where he began his career at and eventually become the club's U21 captain. In the summer of 2012, Tancock signed his first professional contract at the club.

In September 2014, he joined Football League Two side Newport County on a one-month loan deal. Tancock made his football league debut for Newport against Wimbledon on 27 September 2014. After the match, Wales based newspaper Wales Online praised Tancock's performance. On 23 October 2014, Tancock extended his loan for a further month. After two months at Newport County, Tancock's loan spell came to an end and returned to his parent club.

On his return from Newport County, Tancock immediately joined Vanarama National League team Wrexham on a one-month loan deal. Tancock made his Wrexham debut the next day, playing 90 minutes, in a 3–2 defeat to Altrincham. Tancock made one more appearance for Wrexham before returning to his parent club once again.

On 28 May 2015, Swansea City confirmed that Tancock had been released by the club. After a trial at Torquay United, Tancock joined Welsh side Merthyr Town.

In 2018, he signed for newly promoted Welsh Premier League side Llanelli Town. A year later, he joined Haverfordwest County.

International career

Because Tancock was born in Wales, he was among seven uncapped players to be called by Wales under-21. Tancock made his Wales U21 debut on 6 February 2013, in a 3–0 win over Iceland U21. Tancock went on to represent Wales under-21 on six occasions.

Career statistics

References

External links

1993 births
Living people
Footballers from Swansea
Welsh footballers
Association football defenders
Swansea City A.F.C. players
Newport County A.F.C. players
Wrexham A.F.C. players
Merthyr Town F.C. players
Llanelli Town A.F.C. players
Haverfordwest County A.F.C. players
English Football League players
Wales under-21 international footballers